Lords Creek is a stream in New Hanover County, North Carolina, in the United States.

Lords Creek was named for William Lord, who owned the land where the stream is located.

See also
List of rivers of North Carolina

References

Rivers of New Hanover County, North Carolina
Rivers of North Carolina